The following is a list of massacres that have occurred in Cyprus:

Notes

References 

Cyprus
Massacres
Cyprus

Cyprus
Massacres